Gero Kretschmer and Alex Satschko were the defending champions but decided not to participate.
Igor Andreev and Evgeny Donskoy won the title, defeating James Cerretani and Adil Shamasdin 7–6(7–1), 7–6(7–2) in the final.

Seeds

Draw

Draw

References
 Main Draw

IPP Trophy - Doubles
Geneva Open Challenger